Cocks Glacier is the glacier draining the southwest face of Mount Cocks and a considerable area south of the mountain, and entering the Skelton Glacier opposite the Delta Glacier. It was surveyed in 1957 by the New Zealand reconnaissance party to the Commonwealth Trans-Antarctic Expedition (1956–58), and named after Mount Cocks.

References
 

Glaciers of Hillary Coast